St Leonard's ward is an administrative division of the London Borough of Lambeth, United Kingdom. It is located in the south west of the borough and shares a border with Wandsworth.  The ward comprises the western part of the Streatham town centre and is mostly to the west of the A23 Streatham High Road, with the exception of the Stanthorpe Triangle area immediately east of St Leonard's church in the historic village centre. The population of the ward at the 2011 Census was 14,550.

St Leonard's ward is located in the Streatham Parliamentary constituency. The local Member of Parliament since 2019 is Bell Ribeiro-Addy of the Labour Party.

Future Speaker of the House of Commons John Bercow served as a councillor here from 1986 to 1990.

Councillors

Lambeth Council elections 
• * denotes the sitting councillor • bold denotes the winning candidate

Elections of the 2020s

2022

Elections of the 2010s

2018

2014

2010

Elections of the 2000s

2006

2002

Elections of the 1990s

1998

1994

1990

Elections of the 1980s

1986

1982

Elections of the 1970s

1978

1974

1971

Elections of the 1960s

1968

References

External links
Lambeth Borough Council profile for the ward
St Leonard's ward results on Lambeth website

Wards of the London Borough of Lambeth